The Vietnam Memorial Bridge (aka Holyoke Bridge, South Hadley Falls Bridge, and County Bridge) is a girder bridge that spans the Connecticut River between South Hadley and Holyoke, Massachusetts. It was built in 1990 to replace the original Holyoke-South Hadley, the Old County Bridge, which was built in 1889 by New Jersey Steel and Iron Company and was designed by Edward S. Shaw.

See also
List of bridges documented by the Historic American Engineering Record in Massachusetts
List of crossings of the Connecticut River

External links

Bridges over the Connecticut River
Bridges completed in 1990
Bridges in Hampden County, Massachusetts
Bridges in Hampshire County, Massachusetts
Historic American Engineering Record in Massachusetts
Road bridges in Massachusetts
Girder bridges in the United States
Vietnam War monuments and memorials in the United States